"Ramblin' Fever" is a song written and recorded by American country music artist Merle Haggard. It was released in May 1977 as the second single and title track from the album Ramblin' Fever.  The song spent two weeks at number two on the Billboard Hot Country Singles & Tracks chart.

Charts

Weekly charts

Year-end charts

References

1977 singles
1977 songs
Merle Haggard songs
Songs written by Merle Haggard
MCA Records singles